Susan Sheehan (née Sachsel; born August 24, 1937) is an Austrian-born American writer.

Biography
Born in Vienna, Austria, she won the Pulitzer Prize for General Non-Fiction in 1983 for her book Is There No Place on Earth for Me? The book details the experiences of a young New York City woman diagnosed with schizophrenia. Portions of the book were published in The New Yorker, for which she has written frequently since 1961 as a staff writer. Her work as a contributing writer has also appeared in The New York Times and Architectural Digest.

In 1986, Sheehan published in The New Yorker "A Missing Plane," a three-part series about the U.S. Army’s attempt to identify the remains of the victims of a 1944 airplane crash. In About Town: The New Yorker and the World It Made, Ben Yagoda called the article "exhaustive and ultimately exhausting."

Her husband was the journalist Neil Sheehan, who also won a Pulitzer Prize for General Non-Fiction  for A Bright Shining Lie: John Paul Vann and America in Vietnam in 1989. Sheehan and her husband lived in Washington, D.C.

Works
Her other works include:
1967 Ten Vietnamese
1976 A welfare mother
1978 A prison and a prisoner
1984 Kate Quinton's days
1986 A missing plane
1993 Life for Me Ain't Been No Crystal Stair
2002 The Banana Sculptor, the Purple Lady, and the All-Night Swimmer: Hobbies, Collecting, and Other Passionate Pursuits (co-written with Howard Means)

Further reading

References

1937 births
Writers from Vienna
Hunter College High School alumni
Living people
Pulitzer Prize for General Non-Fiction winners
Wellesley College alumni
20th-century American writers
20th-century American women writers
American women journalists
20th-century American journalists
Austrian emigrants to the United States
21st-century American women